Innico Caracciolo may refer to:

 Innico Caracciolo (born 1607) (1607–1685), Italian cardinal and archbishop
 Innico Caracciolo (born 1642) (1642–1730), Italian cardinal and bishop